Khaled Kasab Mahameed or Mahmeed is an Israeli Arab attorney who founded the Arab Institute for Holocaust Research and Education and in 2006 was stopped from attending an Iranian conference on the Holocaust because he held an Israeli passport.

Museum

Origin and mission
Mahameed is the owner of the Arab Institute for Holocaust Research and Education, which he founded in October 2004 or March 2005 in Nazareth after he had taken his two children to see a 20-foot-high wall that Israel had built on some borders of Jerusalem. Time magazine called it an epiphany when Mahameed asked himself, "What would drive the Israelis to do such a thing to us, build such a monstrosity as this wall?" then "gathered his son and daughter and drove them to Yad Vashem", the Holocaust museum in Jerusalem. His reaction: "It was very moving. I couldn't breathe. Six million. It's like something off another planet."

The museum, the first on the Holocaust founded by an Arab, is housed in a portion of Mahameed's legal office. It became more widely known after Mahameed was denied permission to travel to Iran, where he had planned to speak on a conference about the Holocaust.

Mahameed said he had not learned a great deal about the Holocaust in his Arab Israeli school. In Arabic lands, he explained, teachers "would conceal or even deny the genocide". But at the age of six he learned about the event from his father, and later, when grown, he studied in Jerusalem, London and Stockholm, where Jewish classmates told him of the persecution of their parents and grandparents.

His museum, he said, was based on the idea that "the Palestinian people paid the price for the Jewish Holocaust in that they became the refugees and remained without a country. The fact that Jews were murdered in Germany led to Palestinians not having a state".

Conference
Mahameed was invited by the Foreign Ministry of Iran to address an international conference called International Conference to Review the Global Vision of the Holocaust,
held in Tehran in 2005, but at the last moment he was denied a visa because he lived in Israel. He was "terribly disappointed", observing that "'When you don’t understand the Holocaust, it hinders the peace process. I wanted to go tell the Iranians that when you play down the Holocaust or deny it, you are directly hurting the Palestinian refugees who are in camps. By denying it, they are making the Jewish people feel persecuted — which doesn't allow options for peace to develop".

Personal
Mahameed was born in Israel about 1962 in a family that had lost its home in Lajjun during the 1948 Arab–Israeli War and settled in Umm al-Fahm. At a young age, he started his own legal business, venturing capital through building a network between engineers and construction companies, to raise Arab-Israeli employment rates in the region. He has two sisters and ten brothers. In his teenage years, he attended the Arab Orthodox College in Haifa and Hebrew University of Jerusalem, which he left in 1984 to study business administration in Sweden. Returning to study law remotely from Israel (at the East London University), he was admitted to the bar and set up his office in Nazareth.

Mahameed is married to Ezdehar and they have two children. A German reporter noted that Mahameed "wears elegant patent leather shoes, black pants, a white shirt and a traditional Palestinian headscarf".

References

External links
  Mahameed Khaled Kasab Mahameed's Page
  Dan Fleshler, "Notes on a Passionate Palestinian Moderate," September 2009
  Pierre Heumann, "Hören Sie mit dem Leugnen auf," Der Spiegel, 12 August 2006

1962 births
Living people
Arab citizens of Israel
Holocaust commemoration
Israeli Muslims